The Papua New Guinea – Solomon Islands Maritime Boundary Treaty is a 1989 treaty in which Papua New Guinea and the Solomon Islands agreed to delimit a maritime boundary between the two states.

The agreement was signed on 25 January 1989. The boundary passes through the Bougainville Strait and the Solomon Sea. The boundary represents a modified equidistant line between Papua New Guinea and the Solomon Islands. The southern coordinate point is the tripoint with Australia.

The treaty was under negotiation for 11 years prior to signing. In the end, the boundary that was settled on is roughly the same as the 1904 Anglo-German line created by the United Kingdom and German Empire.

The full name of the treaty is Treaty between the Independent State of Papua New Guinea and Solomon Islands Concerning Sovereignty, Maritime and Seabed Boundaries between the Two Countries, and Cooperation on Related Matters. The treaty has not yet been ratified by the parties. In 1994, the two countries signed another treaty that set out principles in managing relations along the border, including provisions for unencumbered border crossing privileges for traditional inhabitants of the islands nearest to the maritime boundary.

Notes

References
 Anderson, Ewan W. (2003). International Boundaries: A Geopolitical Atlas. Routledge: New York. ;  OCLC 54061586
 Charney, Jonathan I., David A. Colson, Robert W. Smith. (2005). International Maritime Boundaries. Hotei Publishing: Leiden.	; ; ; ; ;  OCLC 23254092

Treaties concluded in 1989
1989 in the Solomon Islands
1989 in Papua New Guinea
1989 in Oceania
Papua New Guinea–Solomon Islands border
Treaties of Papua New Guinea
Treaties of the Solomon Islands
Boundary treaties
Papua New Guinea–Solomon Islands relations
United Nations treaties